Elections to the United States House of Representatives were held in Pennsylvania on Tuesday, October 11, 1791, for the 2nd Congress.

Background 
Six Pro-Administration and two Anti-Administration Representatives had been elected on an at-large basis in the previous election.  The elections in Pennsylvania were the last elections held for the 2nd Congress, out of the states that were in the Union at the start of the Congress.

Congressional districts 
The previous election had been held at-large, but for the 2nd Congress, Pennsylvania divided itself up into 8 districts.
The  consisted of Delaware and Philadelphia Counties (including the city of Philadelphia).
The  consisted of Bucks County
The  consisted of Chester and Montgomery Counties
The  consisted of Luzerne, Northampton, and Berks Counties
The  consisted of Dauphin and Lancaster Counties
The  consisted of Northumberland, Mifflin, Huntingdon, Bedford and Franklin Counties
The  consisted of Cumberland and York Counties
The  consisted of Allegheny, Westmoreland, Washington, and Fayette Counties

Note: Many of these counties covered much larger areas in 1791 than they do today, having since been divided into smaller counties.

Election Returns 
Five incumbents (3 Anti-Administration and 2 Pro-Administration) ran for re-election, four of whom won.  The incumbents George Clymer (P) and Henry Wynkoop (P) of the 2nd district and Thomas Scott (P) of the 8th district did not run for re-election.  In addition, Frederick A. Muhlenberg switched from Pro-Administration to Anti-Administration.  Four Pro-Administration and four Anti-Administration candidates were elected, a net gain of 2 seats for the Anti-Administration Party.

Election data are incomplete for the 1st and 2nd districts and are missing for the 4th and 5th districts.

See also
United States House of Representatives elections, 1790

References
Electoral data and information on districts are from the Wilkes University Elections Statistics Project

1791
Pennsylvania
United States House of Representatives